The Complete Arkangel Shakespeare is a notable series of audio-drama presentations of 38 of William Shakespeare's 39 plays.

Description 

The Complete Arkangel Shakespeare is a notable series of audio drama presentations of 38 of William Shakespeare's 39 plays.  The recordings were released from 1998 onwards, first on audio cassette and then later on CD.  

The plays are unabridged and based on The Complete Pelican Shakespeare, published by Penguin Classics.  The music for all the plays was written and produced by composer Dominique Le Gendre. The production features nearly 400 actors, almost all past or present members of the Royal Shakespeare Company.

The Complete Arkangel Shakespeare won the 2004 Audie Award for "Best Audio Drama".

The logo on the box cover features a figure of Shakespeare composed entirely from books, reminiscent of the Renaissance Italian painting The Librarian by Giuseppe Arcimboldo.

The project spanned five years and cost $3 million.  The series represents the collective vision of four individuals: Tom Treadwell, a Shakespeare scholar; Bill Shepherd, a film producer; Clive Brill, producer and director at the BBC; and Dominique Le Gendre, a composer.

The Complete Arkangel Shakespeare was published by Audio Partners.

The cast members of each play are listed below.

 Notes

All's Well That Ends Well 

 Emily Woof - Helena
 Sam West- Bertram
 Edward de Souza - Parolles
 Maggie Steed - Countess
 Clive Swift - King of France
 Denys Hawthorne - Lafeu

Antony and Cleopatra  

 Ciarán Hinds - Antony
 Estelle Kohler - Cleopatra
 Ian Hughes - Octavius Caesar
 David Burke - Enobarbus
 Eve Matheson - Charmian
 Emma Gregory - Iras

As You Like It 

 Niamh Cusack - Rosalind
 Stephen Mangan - Orlando
 Victoria Hamilton - Celia
 Jonathan Tafler - Oliver
 Gerard Murphy - Jacques
 Clarence Smith - Touchstone
 Philip Voss - Duke Senior

The Comedy of Errors 

 David Tennant - Antipholus of Syracuse
 Brendan Coyle - Antipholus of Ephesus
 Alan Cox - Dromio of Syracuse
 Jason O'Mara - Dromio of Ephesus
 Niamh Cusack - Adriana
 Sorcha Cusack - Luciana
 Trevor Peacock - Egeon
 Helen Ryan - Abbess

Coriolanus 

 Paul Jesson - Coriolanus
 Marjorie Yates - Volumnia
 Ewan Hooper - Menenius
 Martin Marquez - Aufidius
 Shirley Dixon - Valeria

Cymbeline 

 Jack Shepherd - Cymbeline
 Stephen Mangan - Cloten
 Sophie Thompson - Imogen
 Suzanne Bertish - The Queen
 Ben Porter - Posthumus
 Ron Cook - Iachimo

Hamlet 

 Simon Russell Beale - Hamlet
 Imogen Stubbs - Ophelia
 Jane Lapotaire - Gertrude
 Bob Peck - Claudius
 Norman Rodway - Polonius
 Paul Jesson - The Ghost/Gravedigger
 Alan Cox - Horatio
 Damian Lewis - Laertes

Henry IV, Part I 

 Julian Glover - Henry IV
 Jamie Glover - Prince Hal
 Richard Griffiths - Sir John Falstaff
 Alan Cox - Hotspur
 Elizabeth Spriggs - Mistress Quickly
 Jane Slavin - Lady Percy

Henry IV, Part II 

 Julian Glover - Henry IV
 Jamie Glover - Prince Hal
 Richard Griffiths - Sir John Falstaff
 Peter Jeffrey - Northumberland
 Elizabeth Spriggs - Mistress Quickly
 Edward de Souza - Pistol

Henry V 

 Jamie Glover - Henry V
 Brian Cox - Chorus
 Ian Hughes - Fluellen
 Bill Nighy - King of France
 Alan Cox - Mountjoy
 Elizabeth Spriggs - The Hostess
 Edward de Souza - Pistol

Henry VI, Part I 

 David Tennant - Henry VI
 Norman Rodway - Duke of Gloucester
 John Bowe - Talbot
 Amanda Root - Joan of Arc
 Isla Blair - Countess 
 Clive Merrison -  York

Henry VI, Part II 

 David Tennant - Henry VI
 Clive Merrison -  York
 John Bowe - Warwick
 Kelly Hunter - Queen Margaret
 Norman Rodway - Duke of Gloucester
 Isla Blair - Duchess of Gloucester 
 David Troughton - Richard Plantagenet
 Kenneth Cranham - Jack Cade
 Jamie Glover - Young Clifford

Henry VI, Part III 

 David Tennant - Henry VI
 Clive Merrison -  York
 John Bowe - Warwick
 Kelly Hunter - Queen Margaret
 David Troughton - Richard of Gloucester
 Stephen Boxer - Edward IV
 Jamie Glover -  Clifford

Henry VIII 

 Paul Jesson - Henry VIII
 Jane Lapotaire - Queen Katherine
 Timothy West - Cardinal Wolsey
 Anton Lesser - Duke of Norfolk
 Sean Baker - Prologue/Epilogue
 Katharine Schlesinger - Anne Bullen

Julius Caesar 

 Michael Feast  Julius Caesar
 John Bowe  Marcus Brutus 
 Adrian Lester  Marcus Antonius
 Geoffrey Whitehead  Cassius
 Estelle Kohler  Portia

King John 

 Michael Feast - King John
 Michael Maloney - Philip the Bastard
 Eileen Atkins - Constance
 Margaret Robertson - Elinor
 Bill Nighy - Cardinal Pandolph
 Trevor Peacock - Hubert 
 Geoffrey Whitehead - King Philip

King Lear 

 Trevor Peacock - Lear
 Anton Lesser - Kent
 Penny Downie - Goneril
 Samantha Bond - Regan
 Julia Ford - Cordelia
 Gerard Murphy - Edmund
 David Tennant - Edgar
 Clive Merrison - Gloucester
 John Rogan - The Fool

Love's Labour's Lost 

 Greg Wise - King of Navarre
 Samantha Bond - Princess of France
 Alex Jennings - Berowne
 Alan Howard - Don Armado
 Emma Fielding - Rosaline

Macbeth 

 Hugh Ross - Macbeth
 Harriet Walter - Lady Macbeth
 John Bowe - Banquo
 Gary Bakewell - Macduff
 Sean Baker - Ross
 Mark Bonnar - Malcolm
 David Tennant - The Porter

Measure for Measure 

 Roger Allam - The Duke of Vienna
 Simon Russell Beale - Angelo
 Stella Gonet - Isabella
 Stephen Mangan - Lucio
 Christopher Benjamin - Escalus
 Desmond Barrit - Pompey 
 Jonathan Firth - Claudio

The Merchant of Venice 

 Bill Nighy - Antonio
 Trevor Peacock - Shylock
 Julian Rhind-Tutt - Bassanio
 Haydn Gwynne - Portia
 David Tennant - Launcelot Gobbo
 Alison Reid - Nerissa
 Geoffrey Whitehead - The Duke/Tubal

The Merry Wives of Windsor 

 Dinsdale Landen - Sir John Falstaff
 Sylvestra Le Touzel - Mistress Ford
 Penny Downie - Mistress Page
 Nicholas Woodeson - Ford
 Clive Swift - Justice Shallow

A Midsummer Night's Dream 

 David Harewood - Oberon
 Adjoa Andoh - Titania
 Richard McCabe - Puck
 Roy Hudd - Bottom
 Amanda Root - Hermia
 Saskia Wickham - Helena
 Rupert Penry-Jones - Lysander
 Clarence Smith - Demetrius

Much Ado About Nothing 

 Saskia Reeves - Beatrice
 Samuel West - Benedick
 Paul Jesson - Don Pedro
 Jason O'Mara - Claudio
 Abigail Docherty - Hero
 Bryan Pringle - Dogberry
 Steve Hodson - Don John

Othello 

 Don Warrington - Othello
 David Threlfall - Iago
 Anne-Marie Duff - Desdemona 
 Suzanne Bertish - Emelia
 Jasper Britton - Cassio
 Stephen Mangan - Roderigo
 Julian Glover - The Duke of Venice

Pericles, Prince of Tyre 

 Sir John Gielgud - John Gower 
 Nigel Terry - Pericles
 Stella Gonet - Thaisa
 Julie Cox - Marina

Richard II 

 Rupert Graves - Richard II
 Julian Glover - Henry IV
 John Wood - John of Gaunt
 Isla Blair - Duchess of Gloucester
 Saira Todd - Queen Isabel
 John Nettleton - York

Richard III 

 David Troughton - Richard
 Philip Voss - Buckingham
 Sonia Ritter - Queen Elizabeth
 Saskia Wickham - Lady Anne
 Margaret Robertson - Queen Margaret
 John McAndrew - Clarence/Lovell
 Stephen Boxer - Edward IV/Oxford
 David Tennant - The Archbishop/Ghost of Henry VI

Romeo and Juliet 

 Joseph Fiennes - Romeo
 Maria Miles - Juliet
 Elizabeth Spriggs - Nurse
 David Tennant - Mercutio
 Trevor Peacock - Capulet
 Jonathan Tafler - Tybalt/The Apothecary
 Clive Swift -  Friar Laurence/Chorus

The Taming of the Shrew 

 Roger Allam - Petruchio
 Frances Barber - Kate
 Alan Cox - Lucentio
 Clarence Smith - Tranio
 Michael Higgs - Grumio

The Tempest 

 Bob Peck - Prospero
 Adrian Lester - Ariel
 Richard McCabe - Caliban
 Jennifer Ehle - Miranda
 Jamie Glover - Ferdinand
 Simon Russell Beale - Antonio 
 Arthur Cox - Stephano 
 Desmond Barrit - Trinculo

Timon of Athens 

 Alan Howard - Timon
 Norman Rodway - Apemantus
 Damian Lewis - Alcibiades
 John McAndrew - Flavius

Titus Andronicus 

 David Troughton - Titus
 Harriet Walter - Tamora
 Paterson Joseph - Aaron
 David Burke - Marcus
 Ian Hughes - Saturninus

Troilus and Cressida 

 Ian Pepperell - Troilus
 Julia Ford - Cressida
 Norman Rodway - Pandarus
 Gerard Murphy - Ulysses
 David Troughton - Thersites

Twelfth Night 

 Niamh Cusack - Viola
 Amanda Root - Olivia
 Paterson Joseph - Feste
 Julian Glover - Malvolio
 Jonathan Firth - Orsino
 Dinsdale Landen - Sir Toby Belch
 Richard Cordery - Sir Andrew Aguecheek
 Will Keen - Sebastian 
 Maggie McCarthy - Maria
 Alex Lowe - Antonio

The Two Gentlemen of Verona 

 Michael Maloney - Proteus
 Damian Lewis - Valentine
 Lucy Robinson - Julia
 Saskia Wickham - Silva
 John Woodvine - Launce
 Nicholas Murchie - Speed

The Two Noble Kinsmen 

 Jonathan Firth - Palamon
 Nigel Cooke - Arcite
 Helen Schlesinger - Emilia
 Geoffrey Whitehead - Theseus
 Sarah-Jane Holm - The Gaoler's Daughter
 Simon Russell Beale - Prologue and Epilogue

The Winter's Tale  

 Ciarán Hinds - Leontes
 Sinéad Cusack - Hermione
 Eileen Atkins - Paulina
 Paul Jesson - Polixenes
 Geoffrey Whitehead - Camillo
 Alex Jennings - Autolycus
 Julian Glover - Antigonus
 Sir John Gielgud - Time, the Chorus

See also 

 Complete Works of Shakespeare

References

External links 
 Measure for Measure, Quite an Earful
 CD PROJECT BRINGS OUT THE POETRY IN SHAKESPEARE PLAYS
 BBC Audiobooks sold
 Shakespeare for the ears / Expansive collection brings all his plays together on CD
 To Buy or Not to Buy?
 2004 Audie Awards® - APA (en-US)
 To the last syllable

2003 audio plays
Adaptations of works by William Shakespeare
Audiobooks by title or series
William Shakespeare